Gryllacris is a genus of Orthopterans, sometimes known as 'leaf-folding crickets' in the family Gryllacridinae.  It is the type genus for the family, tribe Gryllacridini and its subfamily.

The genus primarily has an Asian distribution - from India to the Pacific Islands - with a few records for individual species found in eastern Europe and the Americas.

Species 
The Orthoptera Species File lists:

subgenus Gigantogryllacris
Auth. Karny, 1937; distribution Malesia
 Gryllacris adjutrix Brunner von Wattenwyl, 1898
 Gryllacris athleta Brunner von Wattenwyl, 1888
 Gryllacris bilineata Ingrisch, 2018
 Gryllacris compromittens Brunner von Wattenwyl, 1898
 Gryllacris excelsa Brunner von Wattenwyl, 1888
 Gryllacris heros Gerstaecker, 1860
 Gryllacris ligulata Ingrisch, 2018
 Gryllacris marginipennis (Karny, 1937)
 Gryllacris morotaiensis (Karny, 1937)
 Gryllacris piceifrons Walker, 1869
 Gryllacris producta Karny, 1929
 Gryllacris rhodocnemis Karny, 1929
 Gryllacris ternatensis Karny, 1928

subgenus Gryllacris
Auth. Serville, 1831

species group fuscifrons
Auth. Gerstaecker, 1860 - Malesia
 Gryllacris aethiops Brunner von Wattenwyl, 1888
 Gryllacris barabensis Karny, 1931
 Gryllacris barussa Karny, 1931
 Gryllacris concolorifrons Karny, 1937
 Gryllacris fuscifrons Gerstaecker, 1860
 Gryllacris incornuta Ingrisch, 2018
 Gryllacris jacobsonii Karny, 1924
 Gryllacris ouwensi Karny, 1924
 Gryllacris pulchra Griffini, 1909
 Gryllacris rufovaria Kirby, 1888
 Gryllacris servillei Haan, 1843
 Gryllacris sirambeica Griffini, 1908
species group nigrilabris
Auth. Gerstaecker, 1860 - West Malesia
 Gryllacris kinabaluensis Griffini, 1914
 Gryllacris maculata Giebel, 1861
 Gryllacris nigrilabris Gerstaecker, 1860
species group signifera
Auth. (Stoll, 1813) - India, Myanmar, Cambodia, Malsia, New Guinea, Pacific Islands
 Gryllacris andamana Karny, 1928
 Gryllacris appendiculata Brunner von Wattenwyl, 1888
 Gryllacris bancana Karny, 1930
 Gryllacris buruensis Karny, 1924
 Gryllacris contracta Walker, 1869
 Gryllacris cyclopimontana Karny, 1924
 Gryllacris javanica Griffini, 1908
 Gryllacris modestipennis Karny, 1935
 Gryllacris obscura Brunner von Wattenwyl, 1888
 Gryllacris pustulata Stål, 1877
 Gryllacris signifera (Stoll, 1813)- type species (as G. maculicollis Serville = G. signifera signifera from Malesia)
 Gryllacris uvarovii Karny, 1926
species group voluptaria
Auth. Brunner von Wattenwyl, 1888 - Sulawesi
 Gryllacris libidinosa Karny, 1931
 Gryllacris voluptaria Brunner von Wattenwyl, 1888
species group not determined
 Gryllacris atromaculata Willemse, 1928
 Gryllacris atropicta Griffini, 1911
 †Gryllacris bodei Karny, 1928
 Gryllacris brahmina Pictet & Saussure, 1893
 Gryllacris buhleri Willemse, 1953
 Gryllacris discoidalis Walker, 1869
 Gryllacris ebneri Karny, 1924
 Gryllacris equalis (Walker, 1859)
 Gryllacris eta Karny, 1925
 Gryllacris fastigiata (Linnaeus, 1758)
 †Gryllacris kittli Handlirsch, 1907
 Gryllacris macrura Karny, 1931
 Gryllacris malayana Fritze, 1908
 Gryllacris marginata Walker, 1869
 Gryllacris matura Karny, 1931
 Gryllacris menglaensis Bian, Zhu & Shi, 2017
 †Gryllacris mutilata Cockerell, 1909
 Gryllacris pallidula Serville, 1838
 Gryllacris peracca Karny, 1923
 Gryllacris piracicabae Piza, 1975
 Gryllacris pumila Karny, 1925
 Gryllacris sok Ingrisch, 2018
 Gryllacris solutifascia Karny, 1937
 Gryllacris stylommatoprocera Wang & Liu, 2022
 Gryllacris sumbaensis Willemse, 1953
 Gryllacris vicosae Piza, 1975
 Gryllacris vietnami Gorochov, 2007
 Gryllacris vittata Walker, 1869

subgenus Pardogryllacris
Auth. Karny, 1937; distribution: Sri Lanka, Indochina, west Malesia
 Gryllacris abnormis (Karny, 1937) - Java
 Gryllacris dyak Griffini, 1909 - Borneo
 Gryllacris lineolata Serville, 1838 - Java
 Gryllacris longiloba Gorochov & Dawwrueng, 2015
 Gryllacris ovulicauda Ingrisch, 2018 - Vietnam
 Gryllacris pardalina Gerstaecker, 1860 - Sri Lanka
 Gryllacris spuria Brunner von Wattenwyl, 1888 - Sri Lanka

References

External links

Ensifera genera
Gryllacrididae
Orthoptera of Indo-China
Orthoptera of Malesia